Cedar Bluff is the name of cities in the United States:

Cedar Bluff, Alabama
Cedar Bluff, Iowa
Cedar Bluff, Mississippi
Cedar Bluff, Virginia

Also:
Cedar Bluff Reservoir, Trego County, Kansas
Cedar Bluff State Park, Trego County, Kansas
Cedar Bluff (Union, South Carolina), a NRHP-listed house
Cedar Bluff, a neighborhood in Knoxville, Tennessee